Geranium albanum, the crested cranesbill or Albanian cranesbill, is a species of flowering plant in the family Geraniaceae, native to the Caucasus and northern Iran. A clumping perennial reaching , the Royal Horticultural Society considers it a good plant to attract pollinators. There is a cultivar, 'Pink and Stripes'.

Notes

References

albanum
Garden plants of Asia
Flora of the Caucasus
Flora of Iran
Plants described in 1808